John Patrick Mahon (February 3, 1938 – May 3, 2020) was an American film, stage and television actor. He was perhaps best known for playing Captain Gillette in the 2007 film Zodiac.

Life and career 
Mahon was born in Scranton, Pennsylvania, the son of an attorney. He attended the University of Scranton studying classical languages and English literature. In 1950 he contracted polio, which paralysed him for a time and left him without the full use of his left arm. 

Mahon had acted while at high school, and at university he met playwright Jason Miller who encouraged him to audition for stage plays at Marywood College. Shortly afterwards Mahon joined the University Players. 

After graduating he moved to New York where he worked as supervisor of two paper mills. After two years he decided to try acting as a profession, appearing in off-Broadway productions and also working as a taxi driver and waiter. In 1971 Mahon was nominated for a New York Drama Critics Award in the category Best Actor, for his performance in the play Nobody Hears a Broken Drum. He continued to appear on stage through the 1970s, also directing plays.

Mahon guest-starred in television programs including Frasier, Cagney & Lacey, Studio 60 on the Sunset Strip (7 episodes), Just Shoot Me!, Jake and the Fatman, Steambath, Knots Landing, Generations, The X-Files, Hill Street Blues, St. Elsewhere, Scarecrow and Mrs. King, Diagnosis: Murder, Hunter and The Rockford Files. In 1973 Mahon appeared in a small role in the film The Exorcist. Other film appearances included The People Under the Stairs, One False Move, Bad Influence, L.A. Confidential, The Couch Trip, Armageddon, Austin Powers: The Spy Who Shagged Me and Zodiac. In 1995 Mahon played the role of the chairman of the Joint Chiefs of Staff in the film The American President.

Mahon also provided the voice of Gnorris in the 1995 educational video game, I.M. Meen.

In 2014, Mahon wrote a memoir titled A Life of Make Believe: From Paralysis to Hollywood.

Death 
Mahon died in May 2020 of natural causes at his home in Los Angeles, California, at the age of 82.

References

External links 

Rotten Tomatoes profile

1938 births
2020 deaths
People from Scranton, Pennsylvania
Male actors from Pennsylvania
American male film actors
American male television actors
American male stage actors
20th-century American male actors
21st-century American male actors
American theatre directors
University of Scranton alumni
American memoirists
People with polio